Cyber Storm may refer to:

Computing and military
 Cyber Storm, an annual cyber security competition at Louisiana Tech University
 Cyber Storm Exercise, a 2006 American military exercise
 CyberStorm PPC, a PowerPC based upgrade card PowerUP for the Amiga

Arts and entertainment
 Cyberstorm (novel), a 2013 book published by Matthew Mather
 MissionForce: CyberStorm, a 1996 video game
 CyberStorm 2: Corporate Wars a 1998 sequel